Shanghai Wheelock Square is a skyscraper located in Puxi, Shanghai, China.  It is the sixth-tallest building in Shanghai.

It is located across the street from the Jing'an Temple Station on Shanghai Metro Lines 2 and 7.

Awards and honors
 CTBUH, Best Tall Building Asian & Australia, Nominee (2011)
 International Property Awards: Asia, Highly Commended High Rise Award (2013)
 MIPIM Asia, Business Centres, Bronze (2011)
 Quality Building, Non-Residential Category, Finalist (2012)

See also
 List of tallest buildings in Shanghai

References

External links
 Shanghai Wheelock Square at emporis.com
 Shanghai Wheelock Square at skyscraperpage.com

Buildings and structures completed in 2009
Skyscraper office buildings in Shanghai
Kohn Pedersen Fox buildings
Wheelock and Company